The Garmin Helsinki City Marathon is an annual marathon held in Helsinki, Finland. It was established in 1981 and it used to be held in August but has now moved to May, on the day called Helsinki City Running Day.

The 2007 marathon drew more than 6,000 participants and 50,000 watchers.

The course starts near the statue of Paavo Nurmi and finishes at the Olympic Stadium. Various parks, miles of Baltic Sea coastline, and the Helsinki City centre are all located along the route.

The typical race temperatures have been between 18 and 22 °C and the race time limit is 6 hours. The first prize amounts to €3,500.

The 2008 marathon was run on 16 August. 
The 2009 marathon was run on 15 August.
The 2011 marathon was run on 20 August.
The 2012 marathon was run on 18 August.
The 2018 marathon was run on 19 May.

The 2020 edition of the race was postponed to 2020.10.03 due to the coronavirus pandemic.

Winners
Key:

See also
 Helsinki City Run
 Paavo Nurmi Marathon

References

External links
Helsinki City Marathon
Marathon Info
Many Pictures of Helsinki City Marathon 2008

Recurring sporting events established in 1980
Sports competitions in Helsinki
1980 establishments in Finland
Annual events in Finland
Marathons in Finland
Summer events in Finland
Athletics in Helsinki